HMS Montague was a 74-gun third rate ship of the line of the Royal Navy, launched on 28 August 1779 at Chatham Dockyard.

Montague took part in the Battle of Cape St Vincent in 1780 and the Glorious First of June in 1794.

On 30 October 1794 Montague and  captured the French corvette Jacobine. Jacobine was armed with twenty-four 12-pounder guns, and had a crew of 220 men; she  was nine days out of Brest and had taken nothing. The Royal Navy took Jacobine into service as HMS Matilda.

Montague was driven ashore and damaged at Saint Lucia in the Great Hurricane of 1780 but recovered.

In 1813 Captain Peter Heywood was appointed to command the Montagu in the North Sea and afterwards in the Mediterranean under Lord Exmouth, until July 1816. This was Heywood's last service.

Fate
Montague was broken up in 1818.

Citations and references
Citations

References

 Lavery, Brian, The Ship of the Line - Volume 1: The development of the battlefleet 1650-1850, 1983, 
 Lyon, David, The Sailing Navy List, All the Ships of the Royal Navy - Built, Purchased and Captured 1688-1860, pub Conway Maritime Press, 1993, 
 Winfield, Rif (2007) British Warships of the Age of Sail 1714-1792: Design, Construction, Careers and Fates, (Seaforth). 

 Original as built Plan National Maritime Museum

External links
 

Ships of the line of the Royal Navy
Alfred-class ships of the line
1779 ships